Polypterus bichir, the Nile bichir, is a fish which lives in the Nile and some of its tributaries in Africa. It is a dark grayish color on the top, with a dark vertical marking and bands on the flank. This marking is more prominent on juveniles, and fades as the fish grows.

References

Polypteridae
Fish described in 1803
Taxa named by Bernard Germain de Lacépède